Cecina manchurica is a species of sea snail that has a gill and an operculum, a marine gastropod mollusk in the family Pomatiopsidae.

The specific name manchurica refers to Manchuria, the historical region where its type locality was situated.

Distribution 
This is an Endangered species (type I, CR+EN) in Japan.

The type locality is "Olga and Vladimir Bays, Manchuria, under damp logs near the sea", today in Primorsky Krai, Russia.

Ecology 
This species lives in very shallow water in littoral habitats, including decaying seaweed stranded on the beach.

References

Further reading 
  小菅 貞男 Kosuge S. (1967). "Cecina manchuricaの類縁関係 [Generic Relationships of Cecina manchurica A. Adams]". Proceedings of the Japanese Society of Systematic Zoology (3): 1-2. CiNii.
 Suzuki T., Yamashita H., Miyagi T. & Tatara Y. (2009). "Cecina manchurica A. Adams, 1861 (Caenogastropoda: Pomatiopsidae) from Miyagi Prefecture, northern Japan". Molluscan Divers 1: 5-11.

External links 

Pomatiopsidae
Gastropods described in 1861